This is a list of gliders/sailplanes of the world, (this reference lists all gliders with references, where available) 
Note: Any aircraft can glide for a short time, but gliders are designed to glide for longer.

Canadian miscellaneous constructors 
 Birdman Project 102 Windsoar – Birdman Enterprises
 Brochocki BKB-1
 Czerwiński Sparrow – close copy of the W.W.S.1 Salamandra – de Havilland Aircraft Canada
 Czerwiński Robin – modified Sparrow – de Havilland Aircraft Canada
 Czerwinski-Shenstone UTG-1 Loudon – Étudiants de L'Université de Toronto
 Marsden Gemini – Marsden, David
 NRC tailless glider – National Research Council / Geoffrey Hill
 Czerwiński-Shenstone Harbinger – Shenstone, Beverley S. & Czerwinski, Waclaw
 Viking 104 – Tingskou, Paul – built by Peterson, Oscar "Pete"

Notes

Further reading

External links

Lists of glider aircraft